The Men's 50 metre breaststroke swimming events for the 2020 Summer Paralympics took place at the Tokyo Aquatics Centre from August 25 to August 31, 2021. A total of 2 events were contested over this distance.

Schedule

Medal summary
The following is a summary of the medals awarded across all 50 metre breaststroke events.

Results
The following were the results of the finals only of each of the Men's 50 metre breaststroke events in each of the classifications. Further details of each event, including where appropriate heats and semi finals results, are available on that event's dedicated page.

SB2

The SB2 category is for swimmers who have leg or arm amputations, have severe coordination problems in their limbs, or have to swim with their arms but don't use their trunk or legs.

The final in this classification took place on 31 August 2021:

SB3

The SB3 category is for swimmers who have function in their hands and arms but can't use their trunk or legs to swim, or they have three amputated limbs.

The final in this classification took place on 25 August 2021:

References

Swimming at the 2020 Summer Paralympics